Crowfoot was a federal electoral district in Alberta, Canada, that was represented in the House of Commons of Canada from 1968 to 2015.

It was located in the central part of the province, and is named in honour of Chief Crowfoot, leader of the Blackfoot First Nations in the 19th century.

Even by the standards of rural Alberta, Crowfoot was a strongly conservative riding.  The major right-wing party of the day--Progressive Conservative (1968-1993), Reform (1993-2000), Canadian Alliance (2000-2003) and Conservative (after 2003)-- won every election in this riding, usually by some of the largest recorded margins in Canadian politics.  As a measure of how conservative this riding is, Jack Horner, the riding's original member, crossed the floor to the Liberals in 1977, only to tumble to only 18 percent of the vote in 1979.

This electoral district was also home to the largest margin of victory in any federal riding in the 2004 and 2006 federal elections.  Conservative candidate Kevin Sorenson won 37,649 votes, or 80.2% of the riding's total in 2004. This represented a difference of 34,034 votes, or 72.5%, from the candidate with the riding's second most votes, Liberal Adam Campbell who only received 3,615 votes, or 7.7% of the riding's votes. It was the riding with the highest Conservative vote in the 2004 and 2006 elections. In 2006, Sorenson increased his vote even further, to 43,009 votes, 82.5% of the total.

Geography 
The district included the City of Camrose; the Town of Drumheller; the Municipal District of Acadia No. 34; Wheatland County; Kneehill County; Starland County; the County of Stettler No. 6; the County of Paintearth No. 18; Camrose County; and all of Alberta's three special areas (Nos. 2, 3 and 4).

History 
This riding was created in 1966 from parts of Medicine Hat, Acadia, Bow River  and Macleod ridings.

In 2003, parts of Wild Rose riding were added.

It was abolished in 2012. Most of the riding's eastern portion became Battle River—Crowfoot, with much of the western portion transferring to Bow River and Red Deer—Mountain View. Some outer western portions of the riding that had been annexed into Calgary joined Calgary Shepard and Calgary Forest Lawn.

Members of Parliament

Election results 

	
	

Note: Conservative vote is compared to the total of Progressive Conservative and Canadian Alliance vote in 2000.

Note: Canadian Alliance vote is compared to the Reform vote in 1997.

See also 
 List of Canadian federal electoral districts
 Past Canadian electoral districts

References 

2011 results from Elections Canada
 Expenditures - 2008
 Expenditures - 2004
 Expenditures - 2000
 Expenditures - 1997

Notes

External links 
Elections Canada
Website of the Parliament of Canada

Former federal electoral districts of Alberta
Camrose, Alberta
Drumheller